Gurmail Singh is a former Indian field hockey player. He was part of the Indian hockey team that won the gold medal in 1980 Summer Olympics at Moscow. He is currently an officer in the Punjab Police. He is an Arjuna Award winner. He is married to Rajbir Kaur, a former captain of women's Indian hockey team.

References

External links
 

Olympic gold medalists for India
Field hockey players at the 1980 Summer Olympics
Olympic field hockey players of India
Living people
Field hockey players from Punjab, India
Olympic medalists in field hockey
Year of birth missing (living people)
Indian male field hockey players
Medalists at the 1980 Summer Olympics
Recipients of the Dhyan Chand Award
Asian Games medalists in field hockey
Field hockey players at the 1982 Asian Games
Asian Games silver medalists for India
Medalists at the 1982 Asian Games